Enrico de Jesus Puno (February 13, 1953 – October 30, 2018), better known as Rico J. Puno, was a Filipino singer, television host, actor, comedian and politician. He was considered as a music icon in the Philippines. He started the trend of incorporating Tagalog lyrics in his rendition of the American song The Way We Were and other foreign songs. Puno was known as a singer who regularly infused his on-stage performance with tongue-in-cheek comedy and adult humor. He hosted the noontime variety show Pilipinas Win na Win alongside Rey Valera, Marco Sison, and Nonoy Zuñiga for two months in 2010 replacing Kris Aquino. He also hosted on Happy Yipee Yehey! together with John Estrada, Randy Santiago, Mariel Rodriguez, Pokwang and Toni Gonzaga as one of the main hosts replacing Pilipinas Win na Win. 

Puno was also active in politics. In 1998, he was elected as the city councilor of Makati from its 1st district until his third and last term ended in 2007. He ran for a comeback in 2010 as the vice mayoralty candidate of Makati, but was unsuccessful. In 2016, Puno was elected as a councilor in Makati, under the United Nationalist Alliance (UNA), until his death.

Biography
Puno was born in Manila to Felipe Puno Sr. and Corazon J. Puno. He attended Victorino Mapa High School. Although he earned a Bachelor of Arts degree from the Philippine School of Business Administration, Puno dreamed of becoming a singer.

Music career
Puno introduced himself and his talent to the entertainment business by performing at folk houses and small clubs in Metro Manila. In 1975, while singing at the Palazzi, Puno met and performed with the American Motown group, The Temptations. Puno's talent was later noticed by the executive producers from Vicor Records (now Vicor Music). His first record was Love Won't Let Me Wait, while his first big hit was the Tagalog-infused The Way We Were.

In 1976, Puno won the Aliw Award for Most Promising Entertainer. Two years later, he became Aliw's Entertainer of the Year. His Rico in Concert show at the Cultural Center of the Philippines launched him as one of the foremost Philippine pop stars.

In 1977, Puno covered the Carpenters song Merry Christmas Darling from his first Christmas album, The Spirit of Christmas which was originally sung by Karen Carpenter.

In 1978, Puno's popularity and his regular concerts at the Araneta Coliseum (now SMART Araneta Coliseum) in Quezon City and his performance tours in the United States broke records in terms of audience attendance. His fame also made him into a sought-after product endorser including advertisements for San Miguel Beer in the 1970s.

In 1979, Puno represented the Philippines at the Tokyo Music Festival, with Lupa (Ground), a song that imparted messages on how an individual could strive to change for the better, on how to gain humility and other human values, on how not to judge others, and on how to struggle against one's own weaknesses.

From 2001, the Greatest Hits series in Manila, produced by Viva Concerts helped maintain Puno's popularity.  These Greatest Hits concerts brought him together with other Greatest Hitmakers in the Philippine music scene during the 1980s, namely Philippine pop icons: Hajji Alejandro, Rey Valera, Nonoy Zuñiga and Marco Sison.

He also covered the song Ang Huling El Bimbo in 1994 which was originally a major hit for The Eraserheads.

He also covered the song Mabuti Pa Sila in 2010 and originally composed and recorded by Gary Granada.

During Puno's recent performances, he is often joined on stage by his oldest daughter, Tosca Camille. Rico's son, Rox is also a singer and a band member.

Rico was honored and awarded recently in ASAP Pinoy on ASAP show on ABS-CBN contributing his best in singing performing as a total entertainer who celebrated his 40th anniversary in music and entertainment movie and TV career in 2017.

Hit songs
Puno's hit songs included "Kapalaran" (Fate), "Buhat" (Ever Since), "Macho Gwapito" (Gorgeous Young Man), "Lupa" (Soil or Ground), "Damdamin" (Feelings), "May Bukas Pa" (There's Still Tomorrow), "Ang Tao'y Marupok" (People Are Fragile), "Magkasuyo Buong Gabi" (Together Through the Night) – a duet with Elsa Chan – and his Filipino rendition of "You Don't Have To Be A Star (To Be in My Show)".

One of Puno's recent albums, is Aliw by Sony BMG Records. His carrier single was "Kay Hirap Mong Limutin" (It Is Hard To Forget You) by Lito Camo.

Popularity
The duration of Puno's career spanned more than four decades. He was a favorite of the Philippine Amusement and Games Corporation (PAGCOR) and other casinos around Metro Manila and the provinces. His performances included tours in the United States, Canada, Dubai, Hong Kong, Japan, Australia and European countries.

Acting
Aside from singing, Rico also ventured into acting as a comedian. His first movie was Bawal Na Pag-ibig in 1977.  His first and only action thriller movie was Alas Dose (2001), where he plays as a bad congressman who bombs a preschool learning center.

Hosting
Owing to his rising popularity, various TV networks and movie producers soon came knocking on his door for more acting/hosting opportunities.  GMA Network hired Puno to host a noontime variety show, Lunch Date which first aired in March 1986 and served as a replacement for Student Canteen.  However, in 1987 he left the show after it reformatted.  In 1994–1995, he headlined another noontime show, Chibugan Na (It's Eating Time), aired weekdays at noon on RPN, with Hajji Alejandro.

Puno returned as TV host for Macho Guwapito on the now-defunct Makisig Network. He was one of the judges in the inaugural week of the reality talent show Showtime on ABS-CBN.  In 2010, he also hosted "Pilipinas Win na Win" and "Happy Yipee Yehey!" in 2011–2012.

Business
Puno was also the owner of the karaoke bar, Coriks, at Vito Cruz Extension, Makati. He also managed a trucking business.

Politics
He won a seat in the Makati City Council for the first district in 1998. Among Puno's notable ordinances filed during his first term was the installation of a surveillance camera in every convenience store in Makati that operates 24 hours a day, as protection against robbers who prey on convenience stores. He left the city council after his third and final consecutive term ended in 2007. His seat in the city council was kept by his eldest daughter, Tosca Camille. He then teamed up with Junjun Binay to run for vice mayor of Makati in 2010. Although Binay won the mayoralty race, Puno lost to Romulo "Kid" Peña Jr., who was the running mate of then-outgoing vice mayor Ernesto Mercado.

As his daughter Tosca was term-limited, he successfully regained a seat in the Makati City Council in 2016 under the ticket of Abigail Binay. In October 2018, he left the United Nationalist Alliance and was among the 13 councilors who pledged support to former Mayor Junjun Binay, who would run against his sister, incumbent Mayor Abigail Binay, in the upcoming 2019 elections. He planned to seek reelection but died after he filed his Certificate of Candidacy (COC). He was substituted by his daughter Tosca, who would then go on to win a seat in the city council.

Death
Puno died of heart failure on October 30, 2018, in St. Luke's Medical Center – Global City. He was 65. He was laid to rest at The Heritage Park in Taguig.

Awards
Special Lifetime Achievement Award, ASAP Pinoy 2017, ASAP Show, ABS-CBN 2

Filmography

Television
Rico Baby (BBC)
Rated A (MBS)
GMA Supershow (GMA Network) (1978–1997) – guest performer
Student Canteen (GMA Network) (1975–1986) – guest performer
Lunch Date (GMA Network)
Chibugan Na! (RPN)
Vilma on Seven! (GMA Network) (1986–1995) – guest performer
Showtime (ABS-CBN) – Guest Judge
Talentadong Pinoy (TV5)
Daboy en Da Girl (GMA Network)
Show Me Da Manny (GMA Network)
Pilipinas Win Na Win (ABS-CBN)
Macho Guwapito (Makisig Network)
Willing Willie (TV5)
Umagang Kay Ganda (ABS-CBN)
Happy Yipee Yehey (ABS-CBN)
The X Factor Philippines (ABS-CBN)
Lorenzo's Time (ABS-CBN)
Little Champ (ABS-CBN)
The Sharon Cuneta Show (ABS-CBN, IBC) (1988–1997) – Guest / Performer
Ryan Ryan Musikahan (ABS-CBN) (1988–1995) – Guest / Performer
Sa Linggo nAPO Sila (ABS-CBN) (1990–1995) – Guest / Performer
'Sang Linggo nAPO Sila (ABS-CBN) (1995–1998) – Guest / Performer
Home Sweetie Home (ABS-CBN)
Sabado Badoo (GMA Network)
It's Showtime (ABS-CBN) – Judge of Tawag Ng Tanghalan
Eat Bulaga (GMA Network) – Guest / Performer
FPJ's Ang Probinsyano (ABS-CBN) – Engelbert "Daga" Moreno (guest role) (November–December 2017)
Wowowin (GMA Network) – Guest / Performer
Your Face Sounds Familiar Season 2 – Guest Judges of week 10
RJ's Penthouse (RJTV 29) – Guest / Performer
1 for 3 (GMA Network) – Guest Cast

Film
Instant Mommy (2013)
Who's That Girl? (2011) – Rico
Asboobs: Asal Bobo (2003) – Capt. Palma
Pakners (2003) – Richard de Guzman
A.B. Normal College (2003)
Alas-Dose (2001) – Congressman
Juan & Ted: Wanted (2000) – Mr. Mariano
Matalino Man ang Matsing Na-iisahan Din! (2000)
Alyas Boy Tigas: Ang Probinsyanong Wais (1998)
Sailor's Disaster (1994) – Bruno
Tom & Jerry: Hindi Kaming Hayop (1993) – Alfie
Dr. Potpot Travels to the Moon (1991) – Enzio
Isang Platitong mani (1986)
Annabelle Huggins Story (1982)
Bullet for Your Music (1978)
Silang Mga Mukhang Pera (1977)
Wow! Sikat Pare, Bigat! (1977)
Bawal Na Pag-ibig (1977)

Discography

Albums

Studio albums
The Way We Were (1973, Sunshine/Vicor)
Kapalaran (1975, Sunshine/Vicor)
Rico J. Puno (1976, Sunshine/Vicor)
Spirit of Christmas (1976, Sunshine/Vicor)
Rico Baby (1977, Sunshine/Vicor)
The Total Entertainer (1977, Sunshine/Vicor)
Tatak (1977, Sunshine/Vicor)
Macho Gwapito (1979, Sunshine/Vicor)
Diyos ang Pag-Ibig (1980, Sunshine/Vicor)
Ako Ang May Nais (1989, Ivory Records)
Rico J. Puno (1991, Viva Records)
Aliw (2001)
With Love in Our Hearts (2005)

Compilation albums
The Story Of: Rico J. Puno (The Ultimate OPM Collection) (2001, EMI Philippines)
Once Again... with Rico J. Puno, Marco Sison and Rey Valera Vol. 1 (with Marco Sison & Rey Valera)  (2003, Vicor)
Rico Silver Series (2006, Viva Records)
Walang Kupas... All Hits (2008, Vicor)

Live albums
The Way We Were: Live (with Basil Valdez) (2004, Viva Records)
Rico J. Puno: Live in Hawaii (produced by Willy Martin)

Compilation appearances
The 2nd Metro Manila Pop Music Festival (1978, Blackgold)
Handog sa Pasko (1991, Viva Records)
Metropop Song Festival 1996 (1996, Infinity Music)
25 Great Songs 25 Great Artists  (1998, OctoArts/EMI Music Philippines)
Ultraelectromagneticjam! (2005, Sony BMG Music Philippines)
No. 1 Signature Hits OPM's Best  (2008, Viva/Vicor)
Pinoy Sound Trip Vol. 1 (2008, Vicor)
Pinoy Sound Trip Vol. 2 (2008, Vicor)
18 Inspirational Love Songs (2009, Viva Records)
Live Na Live: Unforgettable Live Performance (2009, Viva Records)
C.H.I.N. Picnic Celebration, Toronto Canada (produced by Joel Recla) (2012)

Soundtrack appearances
Happy Yipee Yehey! Soundtrack (2011, Star Records)

Singles
"All I Ever Want" (a finalist of Metropop Song Festival 1996)
"Cartada Dies"
"Kapalaran"
"Kay Hirap Mong Limutin" (Composed by Lito Camo)
"Macho Guwapito"
"May Bukas Pa"
"Sorry Na, Pwede Ba?"
"Together Forever"

Cover versions
"Ang Huling El Bimbo" (Originally by Eraserheads)
"Give Love on Christmas Day" (Originally by the Jackson 5)
"Kahit Maputi Na ang Buhok Ko" (Originally by Rey Valera)
"Mabuti Pa Sila" (Originally by Gary Granada)
"Merry Christmas Darling" (Originally by the Carpenters)
"Miss Kita Kung Christmas" (Originally by Susan Fuentes)
"Sana Dalawa ang Puso" (Originally by Bodjie's Law of Gravity)
"The Way We Were" (Originally by Barbra Streisand)
"Time After Time" (Originally by Cyndi Lauper) (1987)
"Weekend in Manila" (Originally by Barry Manilow as "Weekend in New England")
"Yakap sa Dilim" (Originally by APO Hiking Society)

See also
Hajji Alejandro
Marco Sison
Rey Valera
Nonoy Zuñiga
Kuh Ledesma
Michael Dadap
Danny Barcelona
Gabe Baltazar
Ariel Rivera
Freddie Aguilar
Martin Nievera
Gary Valenciano

References

External links

1953 births
2018 deaths
Burials at The Heritage Park
Converts to Roman Catholicism from Unitarianism
20th-century Filipino male singers
Filipino pop singers
Filipino Roman Catholics
Filipino television personalities
Former members of Iglesia ni Cristo
Kapampangan people
Manila sound musicians
Metro Manila city and municipal councilors
PDP–Laban politicians
Singers from Metro Manila
United Nationalist Alliance politicians
Vicor Music artists
GMA Network personalities
ABS-CBN personalities